Teresa Marczewska (born January 6, 1948 in Jarosław) is a Polish actress and the wife of the Polish film director Wojciech Marczewski.

Selected filmography 
 Scratch (2008)
 Who Never Lived (2006)
 Quo vadis (2001)
 Weiser (2001)
 Escape from the 'Liberty' Cinema (1990)
 Dekalog  (1988)
 Dreszcze (Shivers) (1981)
 Nightmares (1979)
 Stawka większa niż życie (1968)
 The Sun Rises Once a Day'' (1967)

References

External links
 

1948 births
Living people
Polish film actresses
People from Jarosław